The Church of Our Lady of the Rosary and Saint Dominic, popularly known as Iglesia de los Domínicos, is a Roman Catholic parish church in the neighbourhood of Cordón, Montevideo, Uruguay.

This church is unique in Uruguay as it is perhaps the only temple built in Neo-Mudéjar style in all the country; it also has a brick tower. Held by the Dominicans, it is dedicated to their patron saint Dominic and also to Our Lady of the Rosary. It was consecrated on 6 January 1947.

The parish was established on 18 May 1958.

References

External links

1958 establishments in Uruguay
Roman Catholic churches completed in 1947
Roman Catholic church buildings in Montevideo
Moorish Revival architecture
Cordón, Montevideo
Dominican churches
20th-century Roman Catholic church buildings in Uruguay